Ningwu County is a county under the administration of Xinzhou in Shanxi province, China.

History
Present-day Ningwu County includes the site of the former seat of Loufan County, now part of Taiyuan Prefecture.

In October 1937, the city was occupied by Japanese forces. 4,800 out of the 7,000 residents of Ningwu were massacred by the Japanese.

Climate

References

Citations

Bibliography
 www.xzqh.org 
 .

 
County-level divisions of Shanxi
Xinzhou